R13 or R-XIII may refer to:

Aviation 
 Fouga CM.8 R13 Cyclone, a French sailplane
 Lublin R-XIII, a Polish army-cooperation plane 
 Tumansky R-13, a Soviet turbojet engine

Roads 
 Jalan Gua Kelam, in Malaysia
 R-13 regional road (Montenegro)

Other uses 
 R13 (drug), an antidementia agent
 R-13 (missile), a Soviet missile system
 R13 (Rodalies de Catalunya), a regional rail line in Catalonia, Spain
 Chlorotrifluoromethane, a refrigerant
 Nyaneka language
 R13: Extremely flammable liquefied gas, a risk phrase
 Rebellion R13, a prototype racing car
 ROT13, a simple cipher
 , a submarine of the United States Navy
 R 13, a Buffet Crampon clarinet model